is a Japanese yonkoma manga series written and illustrated by Mikio Igarashi. From March 1986 to March 1987, the series ran in the Takeshobo manga magazine Tensai Club before the magazine was replaced with Manga Club, where it had been serialized from April 1987 to April 2020. It had also been serialized in Manga Life from April 1986 to July 2022. In July 2022, the series moved to Manga Life Original after Manga Life folded. It has been adapted into an anime television series, as well as two anime films and two video games.

While the series is considered a yonkoma manga, most of the "stories" use eight panels. The series follows the main character, a young sea otter after whom the manga is titled, and his daily adventures with his friends from the nearby forest. Bonobono combines gag comic and philosophical questions, bringing up comparisons to other manga such as Azumanga Daioh, and to films such as Forrest Gump.

In 1988, Bonobono won the Kodansha Manga Award in the General category. An anime film was released in theaters on November 13, 1993, and an anime television series was broadcast on TV Tokyo from April 20, 1995 through March 28, 1996. One day after the TV series began, a simulation game was released on the 3DO system. The following June, an adventure game was released on the PlayStation. Several ehon—or "picture books"—have been released since the manga series was first introduced over 30 years ago.

Characters
 Bonobono (ぼのぼの): A mellow sea otter that lives with his father by the ocean near the forest. His mother died in childbirth. He is a bit naive in the ways of the world, and is curious in general. Never seen without a shellfish in his hand, in case he gets hungry.
 Shimarisu-kun/Chipmunk (シマリスくん): A young chipmunk who is friends with Bonobono. He has a habit of asking if people are going to bully him (いじめる? Ijimeru?) and is regularly tormented by Araiguma and his older sister Shō. However, he does bring some of it on himself; depending on the day, he can unintentionally or even intentionally say things to rile them up. Like Bonobono, he always carries something with him, in his case a walnut.
 Araiguma-kun/Racoon (アライグマくん): A young raccoon who is friends with Bonobono. Has a very short fuse and often plays the tsukkomi for his other two friends. Likes to bully Shimarisu, and often gets into trouble with his father.
 Tsunadori Neko-san/Fishing Cat (ツナドリネコさん): An animal who is not native to the Forest, but is the currently named strongest animal there after defeating Higuma no Taishō. Bonobono and friends often ask him questions about certain subjects. In general, he's often portrayed as one of the more sensible residents of the Forest.
 Bonobono's Father (ぼのぼののおとうさん): The father of Bonobono. He is a somewhat bumbling man who tries to bond with his son in silly ways. He speaks with pauses in between phrases. Likes to go on long journeys. His wife died in childbirth.
 Araiguma-kun's Father (アライグマくんのおとうさん): The father of Araiguma-kun. A very ornery animal, he gets set off at the slightest annoyance or indiscretion. Takes out his anger constantly on Araiguma-kun.
 Kuzuri-kun/Wolverine (クズリくん): A young wolverine that walks on all fours. He has a bad habit of pooping all over the forest.
 Kuzuri-kun's Father (クズリくんのおとうさん): The father of Kuzuri-kun. The closest thing the Forest has to a medicine man, Kuzuri-kun's Father has plenty of plants and herbs in his home that are relevant to the topic at hand. Resourceful, but somewhat eccentric. He is very proud of his son.
 Fenegi-kun/Fennec Kitsune/Fenny (フェネギくん): A young fennec fox who is friends with Bonobono and company. Self conscious. 
 Shō Nee-chan (しょうねえちゃん): One of Shimarisu-kun's elder sisters. She loves to pick on him and always wins their fights, but has a soft spot for him underneath her bullying nature.
 Dai Nee-chan (だいねえちゃん): One of Shimarisu-kun's elder sisters. Acts very proper and elegant, but often embellishes information she gets. She desires for Shimarisu-kun to become independent.
 Anaguma/Badger (アナグマくん): A stoic young badger whose acquaintances are Bonobono and friends. No one can tell what is on his mind, since he does not emote.
 Higuma no Taishō/Boss Bear (ヒグマの大将): The former strongest of the Forest before being defeated by Tsunadori Neko. While he is benevolent and wishes to protect the Forest, he does not wish for Tsunadori Neko to be there since he is an outsider. Lives away from his wife and child. Immense in size.
 Shimacchau Ojisan/The Putaway Man (しまっちゃうおじさん): A tall animal that seems to exist only in Bonobono's imagination as a bogeyman. If Bonobono does something wrong, Shimacchau Ojisan will hypothetically come and lock him away in a cave.

Books
In addition to the original tankōbon releases, the first twenty tankōbon volumes have been rereleased in bunkoban format as 15 volumes. Several stand-alone picture books have been released as well.

For the first film, an ekonte—or storyboard—volume and a set of four film comics have been released.

Manga

Tankōbon
Takeshobo released all the volumes of manga listed below.
Volume 1, March 1987
Volume 2, December 1987
Volume 3, September 1988
Volume 4, August 1989
Volume 5, September 1990
Volume 6, June 1991
Volume 7, November 1991
Volume 8, May 1993
Volume 9, October 1993
Volume 10, November 1994
Volume 11, August 1995
Volume 12, January 1996
Volume 13, September 1996
Volume 14, March 1997
Volume 15, December 1997
Volume 16, September 1998
Volume 17, August 1999
Volume 18, December 1999
Volume 19, August 2000
Volume 20, January 2001
Volume 21, May 2002
Volume 22, February 2003
Volume 23, July 2003
Volume 24, January 2004
Volume 25, July 2005
Volume 26, January 2005
Volume 27, October 2005
Volume 28, July 2006
Volume 29, April 2007
Volume 30, March 2008
Volume 31, July 2009
Volume 32, August 2009
Volume 33, December 2009
Volume 34, August 2010
Volume 35, July 2011
Volume 36, May 2012
Volume 37, July 2013
Volume 38, February 2014
Volume 39, July 2014
Volume 40, June 2015
Volume 41, March 2016
Volume 42, March 2017
Volume 43, . March 2018
Volume 44, . March 2019
Volume 45, . March 2020
Volume 46, . March 2021
Volume 47, . March 2022

Bunkoban
Takeshobo released all the volumes of manga listed below.
Volume 1, July 2002
Volume 2, July 2002
Volume 3, July 2002
Volume 4, July 2002
Volume 5, July 2002
Volume 6, January 2003
Volume 7, January 2003
Volume 8, January 2003
Volume 9, January 2003
Volume 10, January 2003
Volume 11, January 2015
Volume 12, March 2015
Volume 13, May 2015
Volume 14, July 2015
Volume 15, March 2016

Film comics
These books contain scenes from the first Bonobono film laid out in comic book format. All were released by Takeshobo.
Volume 1, December 1993
Volume 2, December 1993
Volume 3, January 1994
Volume 4, January 1994

Storyboards
This book contains the storyboards for the first Bonobono film.

Picture books
Various Bonobono picture books have been released, including the following. Titles are listed chronologically.

Anime

1993 film
The first theatrical release, titled Bonobono, opened in theaters on 1993-11-13. The film has since been broadcast on domestic television in Japan, including on broadcast satellite channels such as NHK BS-2. The film has been released on VHS and DVD in Japan, including in a "no cut" edition.

Staff
Director: Mikio Igarashi
Screenplay: Mikio Igarashi
Animation directors: Yūji Mutō, Tameo Kohanawa
Producer: Atsushi Tashiro
Planning: Ippei Takahashi, Masayuki Miyashita, Shin Unosawa, Atsushi Tashiro, Naomasa Tsuruta
Art director: Atsushi Ioki
Music: Gontiti
Distribution: Gaga Communications
Theme song: Hatsukoi
Lyrics: Kanata Asamizu
Composition, Vocals: Yoshiyuki Ōsawa

Cast
Bonobono: Toshiko Fujita
Shimarisu-kun: Sumie Baba
Araiguma-kun: Yūsaku Yara
Araiguma-kun's father: Chikao Ōtsuka
Kuzuri-kun's father: Kazuo Kumakura
Kuzuri-kun: Sakiko Uran
Higuma-san: Yūko Sasaki
Kohiguma-kun: Mayumi Kumagai
Bonobono's father: Mikio Igarashi
Shō Nee-chan: Mayumi Tanaka
Dai Nee-chan: Manami Sasaki
Higuma no Taishō: Tesshō Genda
Sunadorineko-san: Hōchū Ōtsuka
Shimarisu-kun's father: Kazuyuki Sekiguchi
Shimarisu-kun's mother: Yukiko Shibata
Fennec Kitsune-kun: Kanako Tanaka
Fennec Kitsune-kun's father: Takahiro Fujita

Sources:

1995 TV series
The Bonobono anime television series ran from April 20, 1995 through March 28, 1996 as part of the  series on Tuesday evenings from 7:00 pm to 7:30 pm on TV Tokyo. Each episode was 15 minutes long, and was paired with an episode of Bit the Cupid to fill out the 30-minute timeslot. The series has been rebroadcast on several different channels and networks, including Animax and the on-demand internet streaming service GyaO.

The entire TV series was released as two DVD box sets on April 20, 2007.

Staff
Planning: Takashi Sakurai, Atsushi Tashiro
Director: Hitoshi Nanba
Series Director: Tetsuo Yasumi
Character Design: Yūka Hotani
Chief Animation Director: Yūka Hotani
Writers: Tetsuo Yasumi, Yasuhiro Komatsuzaki, Satoru Nishizono, Shōji Yonemura, Kazuhiko Gōdo, Chinatsu Hōjō
Episode Directors: Kiyotaka Ōhata, Takashi Ikebata, Shinichi Watanabe, Takashi Yamazaki, Daiji Suzuki, Kiyoshi Fukumoto, Kiyoko Sayama, Tetsuya Watanabe, Takashi Asami, Kazunari Kume, others
Music: Kazunori Miyake
Audio Director: Susumu Aketagawa
Music Producer: Sumio Matsuzaki
Art Director: Kō Watanabe
Editor: Masashi Furukawa
Director of Photography: Mitsunobu Yoshida
Producers: Keisuke Iwata (TV Tokyo),  Masatoshi Kanesaka
Animation Producer: Kenjirō Kawato
Animation Production: Group Tac
Production: TV Tokyo, Amuse, Inc.

Theme songs

Lyrics, Vocals: Kyōko Suga
Composition, Arrangement: Etsuko Yamakawa
Ending theme for episodes 1-23 and 48

Love, Two Love
Lyrics, Composition, Vocals: Kyōko Suga
Arrangement:  Ryō Yonemitsu
Ending theme for episodes 24-47

Cast
Bonobono: Kumiko Watanabe
Shimarisu-kun: Konami Yoshida
Araiguma-kun: Keiji Fujiwara
Sunadorineko-san: Jūrōta Kosugi
Araiguma-kun's father: Hideyuki Umezu
Araiguma-kun's mother: Keiko Han
Bonobono's father: Takashi Nagasako
Dai Nee-chan: Miki Narahashi
Shō Nee-chan: Mayumi Tanaka
Shimarisu-kun's father: Chafurin
Shimarisu-kun's mother: Konami Yoshida
Kuzuri-kun: Sakiko Uran
Tamago no Kimi-kun: Sakiko Uran
Kuzuri-kun's father: Sakiko Uran
Fennec Kitsune-kun: Michiyo Yanagisawa
Fennec Kitsune-kun's father: Keaton Yamada
Bōzu-kun: Midori Nakazawa
Beaver-san: Masahiro Anzai
Bōzu-kun's mother: Rin Mizuhara
Kohiguma-kun: Aya Ishizu
Kokujira-kun: Aya Ishizu
Higuma no Taishō: Kiyoyuki Yanada
Higuma-san: Junko Hagimori
Hae: Kōji Tobe
Shimatchū Oji-san, others: Nobuo Tobita
Yama-Ō, others: Yūji Ueda
Ki no Obake: Chie Satō
Min Min: Akiko Yajima
Nan Nan: Kōji Yusa
Ōsanshōuo-san: Toshiya Ueda
Kaeru-kun: Toshiya Ueda
Kokujira-kun's mother: Mari Mashiba
Nagareboshi-kun: Hiromi Ishikawa
Rabi Nii-chan: Nobuyuki Hiyama
Chirabi-chan: Kae Araki
Chibisuke to Okera-kun: Fujiko Takimoto
Kashira to Gonzo: Kōji Ishii

Sources:

TV specials
Following the anime television series, nine specials were aired on TV Tokyo. At the beginning of each special, the next special was also introduced and showed some animation from it. The specials used a lot of animation from the series, and while the content fit the season in which the special was broadcast, the music, scripts, and jokes were changed for each of the specials. The voice actors from the TV series were used for the specials.

 Oshōgatsu Da yo: Bonobono no World (January 2, 1997)
 Kodomo no Hi Da yo: Bonobono no World (May 5, 1997)
 Natsu Yasumi Da yo: Bonobono no World (July 21, 1997)
 Taiiku no Hi Da yo: Bonobono no World! (October 10, 1997)
 Oshōgatsu Da yo: Bonobono no World! (January 1, 1998)
 Kodomo wa Kaze no Ko: Bonobono no World! (February 1, 1998)
 Kodomo no Hi Da yo: Bonobono no World (May 5, 1998)
 Shokuyoku no Aki Da yo: Bonobono no World! (September 23, 1998)
 Oyako Anime Gekijō Bonobono: Jōji Namahage (December 23, 1998)

2002 film
 was the second theatrical Bonobono movie, released by Amuse Pictures in theaters in Japan on August 10, 2002. It was done completely in 3D.

Staff
Original Story: Mikio Igarashi
Director: Kōki Kumagai
Producer : Akihiro Itō
Screenplay Supervisor: Mikio Igarashi
Screenplay: Mikio Igarashi, Kōki Kumagai
Planning: Kiyoshi Tsuji, Akihiro Itō
Music: Gontiti
Storyboards: Mikio Igarashi, Kōki Kumagai
Executive Producers: Ippei Takahashi, Yasumasa Makimura

Cast
Bonobono: Yūto Uemura
Shimarisu-kun: Konami Yoshida
Araiguma-kun: Kappei Yamaguchi
Bobo-kun: Etsuko Kozakura
Bobo-kun's father: Masashi Sugawara
Bobo-kun's mother: Sumi Shimamoto
Kuzuri-kun: Yōko Michihira
Kuzuri-kun's father: Yūichi Nagashima
Sunadorineko-san: Reo Morimoto
Araiguma-kun's father: Danshi Tatekawa

Sources:

2016 TV series
A recent anime television adaption started airing on April 2, 2016. Unlike the previous television series, the episode runtime has been cut from 15 minutes to 5 minutes per episode. A Planetarium special Bono Bono - Uchū kara Kita Tomodachi (Bono Bono - The Friend That Came From Space) was shown at the Gotanda Cultural Center from September 16 to October 9, 2017. Crunchyroll only simulcasted the first three seasons of the series. On December 21, 2019, the series had a crossover with Gachapin. The anime was on hiatus due to the COVID-19 pandemic from May to June 2020. It resumed on June 20, 2020.

Staff
Director: Hidenori Yamaguchi

Theme song

Lyrics, Vocals: Monobright

Cast
Bonobono: Fukuko Yukimiyama
Shimarisu-kun: Aya Ogata
Araiguma-kun: Shinpei Takano
Sunadorineko-san: Yūki Kurofuji

Games
Two games based on the Bonobono series have been released.

The second game was titled , an adventure game released by Amuse for the PlayStation system on 1996-06-07.

References

External links
 Official site
 Official 2016 anime site

1986 manga
1993 anime films
1995 anime television series debuts
1996 Japanese television series endings
1997 anime films
1998 anime films
2002 anime films
2016 anime television series debuts
3DO Interactive Multiplayer games
Animated films based on manga
Anime series based on manga
Anime television films
Fuji TV original programming
Group TAC
Manga adapted into films
PlayStation (console) games
Seinen manga
Takeshobo manga
TV Tokyo original programming
Yonkoma
Anime postponed due to the COVID-19 pandemic
Anime productions suspended due to the COVID-19 pandemic